Hugh Robert Armstrong Schofield (born 19 August 1961), is the Paris Correspondent for BBC News, the main newsgathering department of the BBC, and its 24-hour television news channels BBC World News and BBC News Channel, as well as the BBC's domestic television and radio channels and the BBC World Service. He was formerly a BBC correspondent across Europe, the Middle East and United States. He became BBC Paris Correspondent in 1996.

Early life and education
Schofield was born in Cardiff in Glamorgan in South Wales, in 1961. He has an elder brother and a younger sister.

In September 1974, after leaving prep school, Schofield was educated at Clifton College, a boarding independent school in the suburb of Clifton in the city of Bristol in South West England. He entered the school at the age of thirteen as a scholar, where he boarded at School House, and left in summer 1978. The following year, he went to St John's College at the University of Oxford, where he studied Arabic and Turkish.

Schofield's older brother, was two years his senior at Clifton College although he entered in the same year, 1974.  Philip went on to become an Exhibitioner in Modern Languages at Christ Church at the University of Oxford.

Career
Schofield joined the BBC in the 1980s. He is the BBC's former correspondent in the Middle East, Spain, the United States and the former Yugoslavia, and has worked for the BBC in Paris since 1996. He appears frequently on radio, television and the Internet, covering day-to-day French news and providing analysis of politics and the economy. From 2000 to 2008, he was chief correspondent in Paris at the English Language Service of the Paris-based Agence France-Presse news agency. In July 2016 Schofield wrote an article for BBC News Online in which he praised France for responding to the murder by Islamic State of a French priest, Father Jacques Hamel of Saint-Etienne-du-Rouvray. The piece was accompanied by a photograph of Adel Kermiche, the teenage jihadist who had attempted to behead Father Hamel, and a caption repeating the Archbishop of Rouen's quote "Forgive them – they know not what they do."

References

External links
BBC News – Hugh Schofield articles
Journalisted – Hugh Schofield

Alumni of St John's College, Oxford
BBC newsreaders and journalists
British television journalists
British television presenters
Living people
People educated at Clifton College
Journalists from Cardiff
1961 births